Year 192 (CXCII) was a leap year starting on Saturday (link will display the full calendar) of the Julian calendar. At the time, it was known as the Year of the Consulship of Aelius and Pertinax (or, less frequently, year 945 Ab urbe condita). The denomination 192 for this year has been used since the early medieval period, when the Anno Domini calendar era became the prevalent method in Europe for naming years.

Events 
 By place 

 Roman Empire 
 December 31 – Emperor Commodus alarms the Senate, by appearing dressed as a gladiator for his new consulship on January 1. His mistress Marcia finds her name on the imperial execution list, and hires champion wrestler Narcissus to assassinate Commodus; the Antonines Dynasty ends.
 Civil war again strikes Ancient Rome (192–193).

 China 
 May 22 – Lü Bu assassinates warlord Dong Zhuo, who has controlled the central government of the Han Dynasty (since 189).

 Vietnam 
 The kingdom of Champa begins to control south and central Vietnam (approximate date).

 By topic 

 Arts and Science 
 A fire destroys Galen's library.

 Religion 
 Syriac Christians establish an early Christian community in Kerala, India.

Births 
 Cao Zhi (or King Chen), Chinese prince and poet (d. 232)
 Gordian II, Roman emperor (Year of the Six Emperors) (d. 238)

Deaths 
 May 22 – Dong Zhuo, Chinese general and warlord (d. 134)
 December 31 – Commodus, Roman emperor (b. 161)
 Annia Fundania Faustina, Roman noblewoman
 Bao Xin, Chinese general and warlord (b. 152)
 Cai Yong, Chinese official and calligrapher (b. 132)
 Liu Dai, Chinese official, general and politician 
 Lu Zhi, Chinese scholar and general (b. 159)
 Wang Yun, Chinese official and politician (b. 137)
 Yuan Yi (Boye), Chinese official and warlord
 Zhang Zhi, Chinese scholar and calligrapher

References